Conor Myles John O'Brien, 18th Baron Inchiquin (born 17 July 1943), is an English-born Irish clan chief and holder of an Irish peerage. Although his family's ancestral Irish residence has been sold, he remains a landowner in County Clare.

Early life 
He is the son of the Fionn Myles Maryons O'Brien (28 October 1903 – 2 August 1977) and Josephine Reine O'Brien  Bembaron (circa 1913-27 October 2011). Fionn was the son of Lucius William O'Brien, 15th Baron of Inchiquin and Ethel Jane Foster. O'Brien was educated at Eton College.

Career 
O'Brien commissioned into the 14th/20th Kings Hussars of the British Army in 1963. He served as a troop commander in Benghazi, Tripoli, Cyprus on Operation Tosca, Tidworth, Paderborn (as assistant adjutant), Singapore, and Tidworth as adjutant of the regiment. He became Aide-de-Camp to Commander British Forces Gulf in Bahrain and left the army in 1975, retiring with the rank of Captain.

Although the ancestral seat of Dromoland Castle has since left family hands O'Brien has continued to run the lands on the estate left in family hands. O'Brien ran an exclusive guest house in the new family home, Thomond House, adjacent to the former seat, from 1984 until 2008.  O'Brien also turned the residual Dromoland Estate into a sporting and leisure venue. In April 2010, he was awarded €7.9m in damages by the High Court over the repudiation of an agreement to buy 377 acres out of the 600 acres of the Dromoland estate which his family still owned. In 2012, in a long-running dispute with the management of Dromoland Castle, O'Brien was refused an initial application to the High Court for them to immediately return 37 paintings that were loaned several decades prior; the hotel wanted to copy the paintings and then return them, possibly on a phased basis.

Other work 
In 1998, Conor O'Brien visited Antioch, California for St. Patrick's Day and Antioch's first St. Patrick's Day Crinniu, hosted by then-Councilman Allen Payton and the city's council proclaimed "Sir Conor O'Brien Day".

Family 
O'Brien succeeded to the peerage on the death of his uncle, Phaedrig O'Brien, 17th Baron Inchiquin, in 1982.

O'Brien has a sister.

He married Helen O'Farrell in 1988, and together they have two children.

References 

People educated at Eton College
Living people
Conor
1943 births
Barons Inchiquin
Graduates of the Mons Officer Cadet School
Irish Anglicans
Irish chiefs of the name